Troy E. Singleton (born June 30, 1973) is an American Democratic Party politician who has represented the 7th Legislative District in the New Jersey Senate since January 9, 2018. He served in the New Jersey General Assembly from November 21, 2011 until he took office in the state senate.

Singleton has served as the Majority Whip in the Senate since 2022.

Early life 
Singleton was born on June 30, 1973, in Philadelphia and raised in Willingboro Township, New Jersey. He graduated from Willingboro High School and earned a B.S. degree in business administration from Rowan University. He is a member of the United Brotherhood of Carpenters and Joiners of America Local 715 and serves as President of the New Jersey Carpenter Contractor Trust. He has been a commissioner of the Burlington County Bridge Commission since 2009, the New Jersey Turnpike Authority Commission (2009–11), and the Rowan University Board of Trustees (2009–11). He was deputy executive director of the New Jersey Democratic State Committee in 2001. He is also a member of the United Brotherhood of Carpenters and Joiners of America (UBC) Local 255 and currently serves as the Assistant to the Executive. Secretary-Treasurer of the Northeast Regional Council of Carpenters. Troy was a member of the Board of Trustees of the Boys & Girls Club of Camden County.

He has been a resident of Palmyra.

New Jersey Assembly 
On March 29, 2011, Jack Conners announced that, due to redistricting, he would not seek another term to the Assembly in 2011. He announced his resignation on August 26, 2011, effective immediately to accept a position with Camden County as its director of veterans' affairs. Singleton was selected by the Burlington County and Camden County Democratic committees to fill the vacant seat, and he defended it as an incumbent in the general election. He was sworn in on November 21, 2011, to finish the remainder of Conners' term and was sworn into his first full term on January 10, 2012.

New Jersey Senate 
Singleton ran for the Senate in the 2017 election after longtime Republican Senator Diane Allen announced her retirement. His election was one of the gains Democrats made in the legislature in 2017. He was sworn in at the start of the 218th Legislature.

In 2021, Singleton sponsored legislation that would legalize accessory dwelling units (ADUs) in New Jersey, making it possible for homeowners to turn parts of their house into an extra apartment.

Committee assignments 
Committee assignments for the current session are:
Community and Urban Affairs, Chair
Economic Growth, Vice-Chair
Joint Committee on Housing Affordability
Judiciary

District 7 
Each of the 40 districts in the New Jersey Legislature has one representative in the New Jersey Senate and two members in the New Jersey General Assembly. The representatives from the 7th District for the 2022—23 Legislative Session are:
Senator Troy Singleton (D)
Assemblyman Herb Conaway (D)
Assemblywoman Carol A. Murphy (D)

Electoral history

Senate

Assembly

References

External links
Senator Troy Singleton's legislative web page, New Jersey Legislature
New Jersey Legislature financial disclosure forms
2020 2019 2018 2017 2016 2015 2014 2013 2012 2011

1973 births
African-American state legislators in New Jersey
American trade union leaders
Living people
Democratic Party members of the New Jersey General Assembly
Democratic Party New Jersey state senators
People from Palmyra, New Jersey
Politicians from Burlington County, New Jersey
Politicians from Philadelphia
People from Willingboro Township, New Jersey
Rowan University alumni
Willingboro High School alumni
21st-century American politicians
Activists from Philadelphia
New Jersey Turnpike Authority
21st-century African-American politicians
20th-century African-American people